Biankouma Department is a department of Tonkpi Region in Montagnes District, Ivory Coast. In 2021, its population was 238,714 and its seat is the settlement of Biankouma. The sub-prefectures of the department are Biankouma, Blapleu, Gbangbégouiné, Gbonné, Gouiné, Kpata, and Santa.

History

Biankouma Department was created in 1969 as one of the 24 new departments that were created to take the place of the six departments that were being abolished. It was created from territory that was formerly part of Ouest Department.

In 1997, regions were introduced as new first-level subdivisions of Ivory Coast; as a result, all departments were converted into second-level subdivisions. Biankouma Department was included in Dix-Huit Montagnes Region.

In 2011, districts were introduced as new first-level subdivisions of Ivory Coast. At the same time, regions were reorganised and became second-level subdivisions and all departments were converted into third-level subdivisions. At this time, Biankouma Department became part of Tonkpi Region in Montagnes District.

The territory of Biankouma Department was unchanged until 2012, when two sub-prefectures were split-off to create Sipilou Department.

Notes

Departments of Tonkpi
1969 establishments in Ivory Coast
States and territories established in 1969